Princess Hermine of Anhalt-Bernburg-Schaumburg-Hoym (2 December 1797 in Hoym, Germany – 14 September 1817 in Budapest, Hungary) was by birth a princess of the House of Ascania and by marriage an Archduchess of Austria.

Family
She was the eldest daughter of Victor II, Prince of Anhalt-Bernburg-Schaumburg-Hoym, and Princess Amelia of Nassau-Weilburg. Hermine had three younger sisters: Adelheid, Emma, and Ida.

Marriage
She was married 30 August 1815 at Schaumburg Castle. The princess was just 17 years old when she married the 39-year-old archduke. Archduke Joseph had no male heirs, since his first wife, Grand Duchess Alexandra Pavlovna of Russia, died giving birth to a stillborn daughter.

Princess Hermine also died in childbirth at the age of 19, after giving birth to fraternal twins. Both of her children died unmarried and without issue. On 24 August 1819, her husband married for a third time to her first cousin, Duchess Maria Dorothea of Württemberg.

Issue
Archduchess Hermine Amalie Marie of Austria (14 September 1817 in Budapest- 13 February 1842 in Vienna)
Archduke Stephen, Palatine of Hungary (14 September 1817 in Budapest - 19 February 1867 in Menton)

Ancestry

References 
 C. Arnold McNaughton: The Book of Kings: A Royal Genealogy, in 3 volumes (London, U.K.: Garnstone Press, 1973), volume 1, page 388. Hereinafter cited as The Book of Kings.
 Hugh Montgomery-Massingberd: Burke's Royal Families of the World, Volume 1: Europe & Latin America (London, U.K.: Burke's Peerage Ltd, 1977), page 22. Hereinafter cited as Burke's Royal Families of the World, Volume 1.

1797 births
1817 deaths
People from Salzlandkreis
House of Habsburg-Lorraine
House of Ascania
Austrian princesses
Deaths in childbirth
Burials at Palatinal Crypt
18th-century Austrian women
19th-century Austrian women
Daughters of monarchs